is a Japanese romantic comedy television drama series that aired from 27 April to 29 June 2011 on Nippon TV. Saki Aibu played the lead role as an 85 kg weight woman with special makeup. It's available on Crunchyroll.

Cast
Saki Aibu as Nobuko Ōba
Mokomichi Hayami as Taichi Imai
Chiaki Kuriyama as Hitomi Mimura
Ryō Katsuji as Kensaku Kazami
Maki Nishiyama as Yūki Naitō
Ryō Ryūsei as Shirō Tenno
Mayumi Wakamura as Ran Morinaka

References

External links
 
Rebound on Crunchyroll

2011 Japanese television series debuts
2011 Japanese television series endings
2011 in Japanese television
Japanese drama television series
Nippon TV dramas
Japanese romantic comedy television series
Television shows written by Kazuhiko Yukawa